A Catholic lay association, also referred to as Catholic Congress, is an association of lay Catholics aiming to discuss certain political or social issues from a Catholic perspective.

The Pontifical Council for the Laity is the body responsible for approving those Catholic associations that exist at an international level. The structure of some Religious Orders allow for Lay branches to be associated with them.  These are often referred to as Third Orders.

Some of the best known Catholic Lay Associations are Knights of Columbus, Knights of Columba, Catenians, Knights of Malta, the Piusverein in Germany and Switzerland, Azione Cattolica in Italy and the UK-based Catholic Truth Society.

There are also lay Catholic guilds and associations representing a whole range of professions. These include the Catholic Police Guild, Holy Name Society (NYPD), the Association of Catholic Nurses, the Guild of Catholic Doctors, the Catholic Physicians Guild, the Catholic Association of Performing Arts (UK), and the Catholic Actors Guild of America.

List of Catholic lay organisations
This a list of organisations covering Catholic laity. It aims to list ecclesial movements of unspecified standing. For international Catholic movements that have received official approval by the Catholic Church, see Directory of International Associations of the Faithful.
 Apostolate for Family Consecration, founded in the US in 1975 by Jerry and Gwen Conker
 Apostolic Movement, a lay organization founded in Catanzaro, Italy, on 3 November 1979 by Maria Marino. Archbishop Antonio Cantisani and the Calabrian Bishops Conference have approved it statutes.
 Catholic Charismatic Renewal, with around 70 million Roman Catholics worldwide active in the movement, founded in the US in 1967 among college students.
 Catholic Worker Movement: Founded in the US in 1933 by Dorothy Day and Peter Maurin, this movement works for peace and the equal distribution of goods.
 Madonna House Apostolate, founded in Canada in 1947 by Catherine Doherty as a community of priests and laypersons has established missionary field houses worldwide.
National Black Catholic Congress, founded in the United States in 1987 as a successor to the Colored Catholic Congress founded a century earlier by Daniel Rudd.
 World Movement of Christian Workers (WMCW), an international association similar to the Catholic Worker Movement, recognized by the Catholic Church.

See also
 Catholic laity
 Catholic charities

References

 
Catholic Church-related lists
Types of Roman Catholic organization